is a 1956 Japanese comedy-drama film directed by Mikio Naruse. It is based on a play by Kunio Kishida.

Plot
The marriage of Fumiko and Ryōtarō Namiki has gone stale, with both of them constantly arguing about what to do on a day off, or her cutting out cooking recipes from the newspaper before he finished reading it. Their animosities are witnessed by Fumiko's niece Ayako, who pays a visit to complain about her own husband's inattentiveness, and their new neighbours, the Imasatos. When Ryōtarō's company announces the dismissal of some of their employees, a group of colleagues visits him at home and offers him to become their partner in a bar financed with their severance pay, with Fumiko serving the bar's guests. Ryōtarō throws them out and has an argument with Fumiko, declaring that he does not want his wife to take up a job. The couple contemplates a divorce and Ryōtarō's return to his hometown to work on his family's farm. The next morning, a children's balloon falls into their backyard, and Fumiko and Ryōtarō become engaged in a defiant ball throwing game, watched by the neighbours.

Cast
 Setsuko Hara as Fumiko Namiki
 Shūji Sano as Ryōtarō Namiki
 Kyōko Kagawa as Ayako
 Keiju Kobayashi as Mr. Imasato
 Akemi Negishi as Mrs. Imasato
 Chieko Nakakita as Mrs. Kurobayashi
 Daisuke Katō as Kawakami

Reception
Naruse biographer Catherine Russell called Sudden Rain an "extraordinarily bleak film", which nonetheless "offers a poetic treatment of a dismal situation". Dan Sallitt saw the film's depiction of the marital conflict as "characteristically brutal and devastating" for Naruse, despite the "light-hearted formal play".

References

External links
 
 

1956 films
1956 comedy-drama films
Japanese comedy-drama films
Japanese black-and-white films
1950s Japanese-language films
Japanese films based on plays
Films directed by Mikio Naruse
Toho films
Films produced by Sanezumi Fujimoto
Films scored by Ichirō Saitō
1950s Japanese films